Southern Union State Community College is a public community college in Wadley, Alabama.  Southern Union offers academic, technical, health science, and social science programs to the east-central Alabama and west-central Georgia regions.

Southern Union has branch campuses in Opelika, Alabama and Valley, Alabama.

All three campuses offer an open-door policy to prospective students.

External links

 Southern Union State Community College

Community colleges in Alabama
Universities and colleges accredited by the Southern Association of Colleges and Schools
Education in Randolph County, Alabama
Education in Lee County, Alabama
Education in Chambers County, Alabama
NJCAA athletics